Rosalind Cecilia Caroline Hamilton, Duchess of Abercorn,  (26 February 1869 – 18 January 1958; née Lady Rosalind Bingham) was a British aristocrat and the Duchess of Abercorn by marriage. She was a great-grandmother of Diana, Princess of Wales.

Family and Personal Life

She was born on 26 February 1869 to Charles George Bingham, 4th Earl of Lucan, and Lady Cecilia Catherine Gordon-Lennox.

She married James, Marquess of Hamilton, eldest son of The 2nd Duke of Abercorn, on 1 November 1894 at St. Paul's Church, Knightsbridge.

They had five children:
Lady Mary Cecilia Rhodesia Hamilton (1896–1984), who married twice, firstly in 1917 Capt/Maj. Robert Orlando Rudolph Kenyon-Slaney (1892–1965), with whom she divorced in 1930, and secondly, in 1930, to Sir John Gilmour, 2nd Baronet. With her first husband she had two daughters and a son, and with her second husband one son.
Lady Cynthia Elinor Beatrix Hamilton (1897–1972), who married in 1919 to Albert Edward John Spencer, 7th Earl Spencer (1892–1975). They had a daughter and a son. By their son, they became grandparents of Diana, Princess of Wales.
Lady Katherine Hamilton (1900–1985), who married in 1930 Lt-Col. Sir Reginald Henry Seymour (1878–1938), a descendant of the 1st Marquess of Hertford. She was a bridesmaid at the wedding of Prince Albert, Duke of York, and Lady Elizabeth Bowes-Lyon on 26 April 1923.
Sir James Edward Hamilton, 4th Duke of Abercorn (1904–1979)
Lord Claud David Hamilton (1907–1968), who worked as a barrister in the Inner Temple, and who in 1946 married Genesta Mary Heath; he was her third husband and the union was childless.

Community Work
When the Duchess of Abercorn and her husband left Northern Ireland in 1945, it was reported “her willingness to help all charitable and other organisations for the benefit of the community has endeared her to all.”

Girl Guides
She was Deputy Chief Commissioner of Ulster Girl Guides from 1921 - 1925. In 1925 she established the Duchess of Abercorn’s Fund for Girl Guides. She was Chief Commissioner of Ulster Girl Guides between 1926-1945. She was recipient of the Silver Fish Award, Girl Guiding’s highest adult honour, in 1937.

War Work
The Duchess of Abercorn’s “Ulster Gift Fund” established in 1939 was affiliated to the Red Cross and St. John Ambulance. It was instrumental in coordinating the efforts of 214 Hospital Supply Depots in the making of over 3,500 supplies, plus socks, mufflers, mittens and helmets for the war effort.

Other
 1912 - 1922 Vice-President of the Ulster Women’s Unionist Association
 1936 - President of the Ulster Group of the Overseas in London.

Honours
Rosalind, Duchess of Abercorn, was invested as a Dame Commander of the Order of the British Empire in 1936.

She was awarded the honorary degree of Doctor of Laws (LLD) by Queen's University, Belfast, County Antrim, Northern Ireland, in 1944.

Ancestry

References

1869 births
1958 deaths
Daughters of Irish earls
British duchesses by marriage
Dames Commander of the Order of the British Empire
People from County Tyrone
People from London
Recipients of the Silver Fish Award
Bingham family (Ireland)
House of Hamilton